Samuel Perkins Spear (1815 – May 4, 1875) was an American soldier who saw combat in the Seminole Wars, the Mexican–American War, and the Civil War.

Spear enlisted in the army in 1833, and was assigned twice to the 2nd Dragoons and once to the 2nd Cavalry in which he was promoted from private to first sergeant each time.

Spear was discharged from the U.S. Regular Army on August 6, 1861. He was appointed lieutenant colonel of the 11th Pennsylvania Cavalry Regiment and was promoted to colonel on August 20, 1862. He commanded his regiment at the Joint Expedition Against Franklin, October 3, 1862.

He commanded the brigade to which his regiment was assigned in the XVIII Corps; serving in the Department of Virginia and North Carolina to which his regiment was assigned from August 1863 to April 28, 1864. For the rest of 1864 his corps was part of the Army of the James. In January 1865 his brigade had become the 2nd Brigade of the Cavalry Division of said army.

He led his brigade at the Second Battle of Ream's Station, August 25, 1864, the Battle of Fair Oaks & Darbytown Road, October 27–28, 1864 and the Battle of Five Forks, April 1, 1865, during the Siege of Petersburg. Spear was wounded at the Battle of Five Forks and resigned from the volunteers on May 9, 1865.

On January 13, 1866, President Andrew Johnson nominated Spear for appointment to the grade of Brevet brigadier general of volunteers for his actions as a brigade commander at the Battle of Fair Oaks & Darbytown Road, to rank from April 13, 1865, and the United States Senate confirmed the appointment on March 12, 1866.

After the Civil War, Spear became a Major-general in the Irish Republican Army within the Fenian Movement in America and lead the eastern wing of the Fenian Army from St Albans, Vermont into Canada during June 6–7, 1866. He also served as the Fenian Secretary of War within the Fenian Brotherhood during the late 1860s.

See also

List of American Civil War brevet generals (Union)

Notes

References
 Eicher, John H., and David J. Eicher, Civil War High Commands. Stanford: Stanford University Press, 2001. .

External links
 

1815 births
1875 deaths
American military personnel of the Mexican–American War
American people of the Seminole Wars
Burials at Cypress Hills National Cemetery
Members of the Irish Republican Brotherhood
People from Boston
People of Massachusetts in the American Civil War
People of the Fenian raids
Union Army colonels
United States Army soldiers